Brother is the sixth studio album and fourth English-language album by Norwegian singer & A-Ha lead vocalist Morten Harket. It was released on 11 April 2014 through Universal Music. "There Is a Place" was released as the album's first single on 29 November 2013. On 18 January 2014, "Brother" was released as the second single. It was premiered the same day at the Norwegian award show, Spellemannprisen. The song was inspired by the Radical, the memoir of British Islamist-turned-Liberal activist Maajid Nawaz.
It was featured as the Album of the Week on the Ken Bruce Show on BBC Radio 2 from 21 to 25 April 2014. The music video for the song "Brother" was directed by long-time friend and Hollywood director Harald Zwart.

Track listing 
All music written by Morten Harket and Peter Kvint. All lyrics written by Morten Harket and Ole Sverre Olsen, with additional words by Peter Kvint, except "First Man to the Grave", music and lyrics written by Ole Sverre Olsen.

Personnel
Morten Harket – producer, instruments, vocals
Peter Kvint – producer, recording, mixer, instruments, backing vocals
Janne Hansson – strings, drums and organ recording
Simon Nordberg – additional mixing (track 1)
Tom Coyne – mastering
Aya Merill – mastering
Joakim Milder – strings arranger and conductor
Per Lindvall – drums
Jesper Nordenström – piano, organ
Björn Risberg – cello

Charts

References

External links 
 

2014 albums
Morten Harket albums